Chalcosyrphus (Xylotomima) inarmatus (Hunter 1897), the Yellow-haired Leafwalker, is an uncommon species of syrphid fly found across northern North America. Hoverflies are able to remain nearly motionless in flight. The adults are also known as flower flies for they are commonly found around and on flowers, from which they get both energy-giving nectar and protein-rich pollen.

Distribution
Canada, United States.

References

Eristalinae
Insects described in 1897
Diptera of North America
Hoverflies of North America